The 2015 Australian Football League finals series was the 119th annual edition of the VFL/AFL final series, the Australian rules football tournament staged to determine the winner of the 2015 AFL Premiership Season. The series ran over four weekends in September and October 2015, culminating with the 2015 AFL Grand Final at the Melbourne Cricket Ground on 3 October 2015.  won the match by 46 points against , recording their third consecutive premiership. The match was played in October, due to the season starting later than usual.

The top eight teams from the season qualified for the finals series. AFL final series have been played under the current format since 2000.

Qualification 

Reigning premiers  appeared in their sixth straight finals appearance.  also qualified for their sixth straight finals appearance.  finished first, securing their first minor premiership and McClelland Trophy, as well as appearing in their fourth consecutive finals.  appeared in their third consecutive finals series, a feat not achieved since 1973-1975, while  also appeared in their second consecutive finals series and third in four years. The  made their first finals appearance since 2010 while  returned to the finals after a three-year absence.

Venues
The matches of the 2015 AFL finals series were contested at three venues around the country. The Melbourne Cricket Ground (MCG) hosted two elimination finals, hosted by Richmond and the Western Bulldogs, a semi final, hosted by Hawthorn, and the Grand Final. ANZ Stadium also hosted a semi final as part of a contract which requires any final hosted by
the Sydney Swans to be played there instead of their usual home ground, the SCG, until the end of 2016. Domain Stadium hosted four finals for the first time in history with both Fremantle and the West Coast Eagles hosting a qualifying final and preliminary final each.

Matches

The system used for the 2015 AFL finals series is a final eight system. The top four teams in the eight receive the "double chance" when they play in week-one qualifying finals, such that if a top-four team loses in the first week it still remains in the finals, playing a semi-final the next week against the winner of an elimination final. The bottom four of the eight play knock-out games – only the winners survive and move on to the next week. Home-state advantage goes to the team with the higher ladder position in the first two weeks, to the qualifying final winners in the third week.

In the second week, the winners of the qualifying finals receive a bye to the third week. The losers of the qualifying final plays the elimination finals winners in a semi-final. In the third week, the winners of the semi-finals from week two play the winners of the qualifying finals in the first week. The winners of those matches move on to the Grand Final at the MCG in Melbourne.

Week one (qualifying and elimination finals)

Second qualifying final (West Coast vs. Hawthorn)
The opening match of the 2015 finals series featured second placed  and reigning premiers, third placed . West Coast finished the season with 66 premiership points (16-5-1) while Hawthorn had finished with 64 (16-6-0) and both sides had the highest percentages of any team in the top eight; 148.2% and 158.4%. West Coast made their first finals appearance since 2012 and hosted their first qualifying final since 2006. This match was the first time in twenty-three years the clubs have met in the finals; last contesting the First Elimination Final in 1992.

Despite the Hawks leading by one point at quarter time, West Coast restricted them to just 2.6 (18) over the next two quarters, while adding 10.9 (69) to their own score to lead remarkably by 50 points at three quarter time. Hawthorn's half time score was its lowest since Round 15, 2011 against . Hawthorn kicked five goals to two in the last quarter to add some respectability, with the final margin being thirty two points. The Eagles advanced to their first home preliminary final since  2005, while Hawthorn were forced to play off in a semi final for the first time since 2011; having won their previous three qualifying finals in 2012, 2013 and 2014.

Scorecard

First qualifying final (Fremantle vs. Sydney)
The first qualifying final was played between minor premiers  and fourth placed . This match saw a reversal of the previous year's First Qualifying Final; where Sydney hosted Fremantle and marked the fourth final between the two clubs; including preliminary finals in 2006 and 2013.

Fielding a team missing Lance Franklin, Kieren Jack and Luke Parker, the Swans threw everything at the minor premiers but were left to rue their inaccuracy; kicking 7.18 to 10.9 to lose by nine points. This was emphasized by several behinds late in the game that could have seen the match go to extra time. The Swans Josh Kennedy set a record for most consecutive games with thirty or more disposals (eleven); while Fremantle's Aaron Sandilands broke  ruckman Gary Dempsey's record for most hit outs in a season (952). Fremantle advanced to their second home preliminary final in three years; meaning both preliminary finals would be played outside Melbourne for the first time since 2006; while Sydney were forced to play off in a semi final the next week.

Scorecard

Second elimination final (Western Bulldogs vs. Adelaide)
The match took place on the night of 12 September 2015, at the Melbourne Cricket Ground. Both teams had not featured in the finals for several years; with the Bulldogs making their first finals appearance since losing the 2010 Preliminary Final and Adelaide last appearing in the 2012 Preliminary Final. This marked the third final between the two teams, after they contested preliminary finals in 1997 and 1998; which were both won by the Crows in their two premiership years.

In a high-scoring, energetic game, the Bulldogs scored the first four goals of the game before Adelaide kicked the next five to lead by nine points at quarter time. The scoring lessened in the second quarter but the Crows led by eight, extending their lead to eleven at three quarter time. The Dogs quickly erased this lead to get their noses in front by eight points midway through the final quarter; before goals to Taylor Walker and Charlie Cameron sealed a seven-point win to the Crows; condemning the Western Bulldogs to another heartbreaking finals loss. Adelaide advanced to a semi final against Hawthorn, while the Bulldogs were eliminated.

Scorecard

First elimination final (Richmond vs. North Melbourne)
The two teams had met the week previously in Round 23; where North Melbourne rested several senior players and Richmond won by forty-one points. This was also the first final between the two clubs in 20 years, having last met in the 1995 Qualifying Final.

Despite leading by three points at quarter time and thirteen at half time, Richmond began to tire in the second half and North Melbourne's decision to rest senior players the previous week began to pay dividends. Off season recruits Jarrad Waite and Shaun Higgins showed why the Kangaroos had recruited them; with Waite booting four goals and Higgins showing his courage after a hard collision with Dylan Grimes earlier in the match. North led by four points at three quarter time, kicking four goals to two to overrun Richmond, who despite being the more accurate side all day missed some crucial opportunities late, including a behind to Ty Vickery with around seven minutes to go. The Kangaroos iced the game with Waite's fourth goal and condemned the Tigers to a third consecutive elimination final defeat, while advancing to play the Sydney Swans in a semi final. Richmond's loss meant their finals drought, dating back to 2001, would continue.

Scorecard

Week two (semi-finals)

Second semi-final (Hawthorn vs. Adelaide)
This marked the fourth final between the two sides, with Hawthorn defeating the Crows in the 2007 Elimination Final and 2012 Preliminary Final; while Adelaide won an elimination final against the Hawks in 1993.

Hawthorn established a match winning lead with an eight-goal first term, dispelling any thoughts that the back-to-back premiers were past their prime. The forty-five point deficit at half time was the worst the Crows had faced in a final, with the Hawks extending their lead to sixty at three quarter time and seventy four points at the final siren. Luke Breust bounced back from three goalless weeks with a six-goal haul, while Luke Hodge was also prolific with four goals and twenty-four disposals. Hawthorn advanced to a preliminary final against , while Adelaide were eliminated.

Scorecard

First semi-final (Sydney vs. North Melbourne)
This marked the fourth final between the two teams, with Sydney winning the 2014 Preliminary Final and 2008 Elimination Final; while North Melbourne significantly won the Grand Final in 1996.

Scorecard

Week three (preliminary finals)

First preliminary final (Fremantle vs. Hawthorn)

Second preliminary final (West Coast vs. North Melbourne)

Week four (Grand Final)

References

External links

AFL finals series official website

Finals Series, 2015